Baci is a traditional Lao ceremony used to celebrate important events and occasions.

Baci or BACI may also refer to:
 Baci, a chocolate product of the Italian confectionery company Perugina
 Alis Baci, an Albanian football player
 Before-After-Control-Impact, an experiment design commonly used to monitor potential environmental impacts